Des Moines Bruins were a minor league baseball based in Des Moines, Iowa. The team played in the Western League from 1947 to 1958. Their home ballpark was Pioneer Memorial Stadium, and they were affiliated with the Chicago Cubs (1947–1957) and Los Angeles Dodgers (1958).

Year-by-year record

References

Baseball teams established in 1947
Defunct baseball teams in Iowa
Sports in Des Moines, Iowa
Defunct minor league baseball teams
Baseball teams disestablished in 1958
1947 establishments in Iowa
1958 disestablishments in Iowa
Chicago Cubs minor league affiliates
Los Angeles Dodgers minor league affiliates
Defunct Western League teams